Montecito (Spanish for "Little mountain") is an unincorporated town and census-designated place in Santa Barbara County, California, United States. Located on the Central Coast of California, Montecito sits between the Santa Ynez Mountains and the Pacific Ocean and had a population of 8,638 in 2020. Montecito is best known as a "celebrity enclave", owing to its concentration of prominent residents.

History

The site of present-day Montecito, along with the entire south coast of Santa Barbara County, was inhabited for over 10,000 years by the Chumash Indians. The Spanish arrived in the 18th century but left the region largely unsettled while they built the Presidio and Mission Santa Barbara farther west.

In the middle of the 19th century, the area was known as a haven for bandits and highway robbers, who hid in the oak groves and canyons, preying on traffic on the coastal route between the towns that developed around the missions. By the end of the 1860s, the bandit gangs were gone, and Italian settlers arrived. Finding an area reminiscent of Italy, they built farms and gardens similar to those they had left behind.

Around the end of the 19th century, wealthy tourists from the eastern and midwestern United States began to buy land in the area. It was near enough to Santa Barbara for essential services while still being secluded. Desirable weather and several nearby hot springs offered the promise of comfortable, healthy living, in addition to the availability of affordable land.

The Montecito Hot Springs Hotel was built near the largest of the springs, in a canyon north of the town center and directly south of Montecito Peak, in Hot Springs Canyon. The hotel burned down in 1920; it was replaced a few years later by the smaller Hot Springs Club.

The architect George Washington Smith is noted particularly for his residences around Montecito, and for popularizing the Spanish Colonial Revival style in early 20th century America, as is Lutah Maria Riggs, who started as a draftsman in Smith's firm, rose to partner, and later started her own firm.

Montecito was evacuated five times in four months between December 2017 and March 2018 because of weather-related events, which included the Thomas Fire, the 2018 Southern California mudflows, and flooding related to the Pineapple Express.  The mudflows resulted in 20 reported deaths; 28 others were injured, and at least four people were reported missing. FEMA gave the Santa Barbara County Flood Control District $13.5 million in 2020. The funds will be used to buy land in Montecito to construct an $18 million project that will help control debris flows from San Ysidro Creek with a larger debris basin.

Geography

March and April are the months to watch gray whales migrate north from Mexico through the Santa Barbara Channel. The community provides access to backcountry hiking trails.

Climate
Montecito experiences a warm Mediterranean climate (Köppen climate classification: Csb) characteristic of coastal Southern California. Because of Montecito's proximity to the ocean, onshore breezes significantly moderate temperatures, resulting in warmer winters and cooler summers compared with places further inland. With its gentle Mediterranean climate, Montecito has long been a desirable location for horticulturists.

Demographics

2010

The 2010 United States Census reported that Montecito had a population of 8,965. The racial makeup of Montecito was 8,267 (92.2%) White, 218 (2.4%) Asian, 55 (0.6%) African American, 38 (0.4%) Native American, 6 (0.1%) Pacific Islander, 156 (1.7%) from other races, and 225 (2.5%) from two or more races. Hispanic or Latino of any race were 605 persons (6.7%).

The Census reported that 8,033 people (89.6% of the population) lived in households, 932 (10.4%) lived in non-institutionalized group quarters, and none were institutionalized.

Of the 3,432 households, 831 (24.2%) had children under the age of 18 living in them; 1,936 (56.4%) were opposite-sex married couples living together, 234 (6.8%) had a female householder with no husband present, 93 (2.7%) had a male householder with no wife present. There were 110 (3.2%) unmarried opposite-sex partnerships, and 36 (1.0%) same-sex married couples or partnerships. 941 households (27.4%) were made up of individuals, and 527 (15.4%) had someone living alone who was 65 years of age or older. The average household size was 2.34. There were 2,263 families (65.9% of all households); the average family size was 2.79.

The age spread of the population accounts 1,515 people (16.9%) under the age of 18, 1,234 people (13.8%) aged 18 to 24, 1,169 people (13.0%) aged 25 to 44, 2,716 people (30.3%) aged 45 to 64, and 2,331 people (26.0%) who were 65 years of age or older. The median age was 50.0 years. For every 100 females, there were 87.3 males. For every 100 females age 18 and over, there were 83.9 males.

The homeowner vacancy rate was 2.4%; the rental vacancy rate was 8.7%. 6,081 people (67.8% of the population) lived in owner-occupied housing units and 1,952 people (21.8%) lived in rental housing units.

2000

The census of 2000 counted 10,000 people, 3,686 households, and 2,454 families residing in the census-designated place (CDP). The racial makeup of the CDP was 94.0% White, 0.5% African American, 0.3% Native American, 1.3% Asian, 0.2% Pacific Islander, 2.1% from other races, and 1.5% from two or more races. Hispanic or Latino of any race were 5.2% of the population.

Out of the total of 3,686 households, 25.7% had children under the age of 18 living with them, 57.1% were married couples living together, 7.2% had a female householder with no husband present, and 33.4% were non-families. 27.0% of all households were made up of individuals, and 14.0% had someone living alone who was 65 years of age or older.  The average household size was 2.41 and the average family size was 2.85.

The CDP population age distribution was 18.4% under the age of 18, 13.5% from 18 to 24, 16.6% from 25 to 44, 30.0% from 45 to 64, and 21.5% who were 65 years of age or older. The median age was 46 years. For every 100 females, there were 84.7 males.  For every 100 females age 18 and over, there were 82.1 males.

The median income for a household in the CDP was $110,669, and the median income for a family was $130,123. Males had a median income of $81,719 versus US$42,182 for females. The per capita income for the CDP was $70,077. About 2.3% of families and 3.8% of the population were below the poverty line, including 2.6% of those under age 18 and 2.2% of those age 65 or over.

Government

As an unincorporated area of Santa Barbara County, Montecito has no city government. Residents must rely on the county government for all municipal services. Instead of voting for a city council, all of Montecito's residents are represented by only one of the five seats on the county board of supervisors.  Unlike other unincorporated areas in the county, Montecito does have two government agencies which together act as its planning commission: the Montecito Board of Architectural Review and the Montecito Planning Commission.  Municipal incorporation is a perennially recurring issue in local politics, but has never come to fruition.  Like other unincorporated areas, Montecito's law enforcement agency is the Santa Barbara County Sheriff's Office.

Technically, Montecito does not include areas such as Coast Village Road, which are often confused with and thought to be part of Montecito but are actually within the city limits of Santa Barbara.

Transportation

Notable roads spanning Montecito include East Valley Road, Mountain Drive, and Sycamore Canyon Road, all of which form part of State Route 192. In addition, the U.S. 101 Freeway runs along the south end of town, connecting it with other cities in Santa Barbara County and the rest of Southern California.

Education

Children in Montecito are enrolled at Montecito Union Elementary School and Cold Spring Elementary School. Both of these K-6 schools are operated by school districts which only run one school.

Montecito does not have any public schools serving grades 7–12.  Students who wish to attend public schools must enroll in the Santa Barbara Unified School District and commute to Santa Barbara Junior High School, followed by Santa Barbara High School.

The four year Westmont College is located in the hills above Montecito.

Notable architecture 
 Lotusland – design and botanic gardens 
 El Fureidis – private residence designed by Bertram Grosvenor Goodhue
 Music Academy of the West
 Casa del Herrero – Spanish Colonial revival home and gardens – designed by George Washington Smith
 Santa Barbara Biltmore: Coral Casino Beach and Cabana Club – designed by Gardner Dailey; 
 Montecito Inn – built by Charlie Chaplin
 Santa Barbara Vedanta Temple – designed by Lutah Maria Riggs
 Our Lady of Mount Carmel Church
 George Washington Smith home and studio

Notable people 

 Douglas Adams
 Troy Aikman
 Dame Judith Anderson
 Ross Bagdasarian, Jr. & Janice Karman
 William Baldwin
 Thomas J. Barrack, Jr.
 Drew Barrymore (2010–2013)
 Jason Bateman
Orlando Bloom
 T. C. Boyle
 Jeff Bridges
 Mike Bryan
 Carol Burnett
 Elizabeth Eaton Burton
 Frank Caufield
 Julia Child
 Frank Chuman
 John Cleese
 Robert M. Colleary (1929–2012)<ref>"Robert M. Colleary, 82", The Montclair Times, February 23, 2012. Accessed April 15, 2022. "He went on to become executive producer of Benson and 'It's A Living, retiring to Montecito in 1989."</ref>
 Jimmy Connors
 Fred Couples
 Christopher Cross
 Tom Cruise
 Elizabeth Daily
 Larry David
 Portia de Rossi
 Ellen DeGeneres
 Bradford Dillman
 Michael Douglas
 James Ellison
 Anne Francis
Tom Freston
 Bob Gale
 Martin Lee Gore
 Tipper Gore
 Sue Grafton
 Andy Granatelli
 Ariana Grande
 Gene Hackman
 The Duke of Sussex and Meghan, Duchess of Sussex
 Pamela Hensley
 Paul Hogan
 Tab Hunter
 Kathy Ireland
 Burl Ives
 Bruce Johnston
 Olivier Leclercq 
 Christopher Lloyd
 Kenny Loggins
 Julia Louis-Dreyfus
 Rob Lowe
 David Manners
 Steve Martin
 Dennis Miller
 Jack Mitchell
 Robert Mitchum
 Charlie Munger
 Paul Muni
 Peter Noone
 Brad Paisley
 Jack Palance
Gwyneth Paltrow
 Suzy Parker
 Zack Pearlman
 Katy Perry
 Chynna Phillips
 Robert Preston
 Adam Pritzker
 Ivan Reitman
 Eva Marie Saint
 John Sanford
 Lori Saunders
 Eric Schmidt
 Ed Snider
 Peter Sperling
 Timothy Stack
 Thomas Steinbeck
 Shaun Tomson
 John Travolta
 E. Duke Vincent
 Joe Walsh
 Ganna Walska
 Ty Warner
 Stuart Whitman
 John Whittemore
 Bruce Willis
 Owen Wilson
 Oprah Winfrey

 In popular culture 

 20th Century Women 2016 film by Mike Mills 
 It's Complicated 2009 film by Nancy Myers
 An American Family 1973 PBS documentary series. America's "first reality TV show" follows the Loud family which lives on Mountain Drive. This story was revisited in the fictionalized 2011 HBO drama Cinema Verite

See also
 History of Santa Barbara, California
 Shalawa Meadow, California

References

Bibliography
 Baker, Gayle.  Santa Barbara''.  Harbor Town Histories, Santa Barbara.  2003.  .

External links

 Montecito Association
 Montecito International Music Festival

 
Census-designated places in Santa Barbara County, California
Populated coastal places in California
Census-designated places in California